The 2006–07 Midland Football Alliance season was the 13th in the history of Midland Football Alliance, a football competition in England.

Clubs and league table
The league featured 19 clubs from the previous season, along with three new clubs:
Atherstone Town, promoted from the Midland Football Combination
Friar Lane & Epworth, promoted from the Leicestershire Senior League
Market Drayton Town, promoted from the West Midlands (Regional) League

League table

References

External links
 Midland Football Alliance

2006–07
9